Robert Craig Wright (September 25, 1914 – July 27, 2005) was an American composer-lyricist for Hollywood and the musical theatre, best known for the Broadway musical and musical film Kismet, for which he and his professional and romantic partner George Forrest adapted themes by Alexander Borodin and added lyrics. Kismet was one of several Wright and Forrest creations that was commissioned by impresario Edwin Lester for the Los Angeles Civic Light Opera. Song of Norway, Gypsy Lady, Magdalena, and their adaptation of The Great Waltz were also commissioned by Lester for the LACLO. The LACLO passed most of these productions to Broadway.

Wright was born in Daytona Beach, Florida, United States. Wright and Forrest had an affinity for adapting classical music themes and adding lyrics to these themes for Hollywood and the Broadway musical stage. Wright said that the music was usually a 50-50 "collaboration" between Wright and Forrest and the composer. While both men were credited equally as composer-lyricists, it was Forrest who worked with the music. Forrest and Wright won a Tony Award for their work on Kismet and, in 1995, they were awarded the ASCAP Foundation Richard Rodgers Award.

He was cremated at Cofer-Kolski-Combs mortuary, Miami, and his ashes given to his executor.

Film work
 (1936) New Shoes (short feature), After the Thin Man, Maytime, The Longest Night, Libeled Lady, Sinner Take All
 (1937) Bad Man of Brimstone, The Firefly, The Good Old Soak, London by Night, Madame X, Mama Steps Out, Mannequin, Man of the People, Navy Blue and Gold, Parnell, Saratoga, You're Only Young Once
 (1938) Broadway Serenade, The First Hundred Years, The Girl Downstairs, Happily Buried (short feature), The Hardys Ride High, Honolulu, Let Freedom Ring, Lord Jeff, The Magician's Daughter (short feature), Marie Antoinette, Nuts and Bolts (short feature), Our Gang Follies (short feature), Paradise for Three, Snow Gets in Your Eyes (short feature), Sweethearts, Three Comrades, The Toy Wife, Vacation from Love
 (1939) Balalaika, Florian, Music in My Heart, The New Moon, Strange Cargo, These Glamour Girls, The Women
 (1940) "Blondie Goes Latin", "Dance, Girl, Dance", "Kit Carson", "South of Pago-Pago"
 (1941) "Cubana", "Fiesta", "Playing with Music", "I Married an Angel", "Rio Rita"
 (1955) "Kismet", "Make Believe Ballroom", "Rainbow 'Round My Shoulder"
 (1970) Song of Norway (This film featured adaptations of different music of Edvard Grieg than that of the 1944 Broadway show of the same title.)
 (1972) The Great Waltz

Hit songs of their day include "The Donkey Serenade" (written with composer Herbert Stothart "based on a theme of Rudolf Friml") from "The Firefly", "Always and Always" from Mannequin and "It's a Blue World" from Music in My Heart.

Shows
 Song of Norway (1944); adapting the music of Edvard Grieg
 Gypsy Lady (Romany Love) (1947); using the music of Victor Herbert
 Magdalena (1948); using the music of Heitor Villa-Lobos, working directly with the composer
 The Great Waltz (1949); adapting the music of Johann Strauss
 Kismet (1953); adapting the music of Alexander Borodin
 At the Grand (1958); original music and lyrics
 The Love Doctor (London, 1959); original music and lyrics
 Kean (1961); original music and lyrics
 Anya (1965); adapting the music of Sergei Rachmaninoff
 Timbuktu! (1978); a reworking of Kismet for an African-American cast, adding a few new songs
 Grand Hotel (1989); a reworking of At the Grand with additional music and lyrics by Maury Yeston

Hit songs of their day include "Strange Music" from Song of Norway; and "Stranger in Paradise", "Baubles, Bangles and Beads" and "And This Is My Beloved" from Kismet.

References

External links

 New York Times Obituary
 Music Theatre International Biography

1914 births
2005 deaths
People from Daytona Beach, Florida
Songwriters from Florida
Tony Award winners
Musicians from Daytona Beach, Florida
20th-century American musicians
Broadway composers and lyricists